Frouzins is a commune in the Haute-Garonne department in southwestern France. It lies 15 km southwest from the centre of Toulouse and 6 km north of Muret.

Population

Sister cities
 Calanda, Spain

See also
Communes of the Haute-Garonne department

References

Communes of Haute-Garonne